The Sunday Times Rich List 2018 is the 30th annual survey of the wealthiest people resident in the United Kingdom, published by The Sunday Times on 13 May 2018.

The List was edited by Robert Watts who succeeded long-term compiler Philip Beresford last year.

The List was previewed in the previous week's Sunday Times and widely reported by other media.

Top 12 fortunes

See also 
 Forbes list of billionaires

References

External links 
 Sunday Times Rich List

Sunday Times Rich List
2018 in the United Kingdom